Maraq or Marq or Marraq may refer to:

 Maraq (dish), a Somali soup dish
 Maraq, Azerbaijan, a village in Azerbaijan
 Maraq, Isfahan, a village in Iran
 Maraq, Markazi, a village in Iran

See also 
 
 Marak (disambiguation)
 Marq (disambiguation)